David Ainsworth (1842 – 21 March 1906) was a British Liberal Party politician.  He first elected a Member of Parliament (MP) for the West Division of Cumberland at the 1880 general election.  He had run unsuccessfully for this position in 1874.  In 1885 and 1886 he ran for the Egremont constituency in Parliament, but lost.  He however won the election to this constituency in 1892, but held the seat for only three years, being defeated at the 1895 general election.

Ainsworth was the brother of John Stirling Ainsworth.

References

Sources
W. W. Bean. The Parliamentary Representation of Six Northern Counties of England. (1890) p. 15.

External links 
 

1842 births
1906 deaths
Liberal Party (UK) MPs for English constituencies
UK MPs 1880–1885
UK MPs 1892–1895